Charak may refer to:
Bandar Charak, a city in Iran
Charak, Bushehr, a village in Iran
Charaka, ancient Ayurveda figure
Charak Puja, a folk festival of Bengal
Charak, Yarkant County, Kashgar Prefecture, Xinjiang